Rolf Lamers (8 July 1927 – 17 October 2016) was a German middle-distance runner. He competed in the men's 1500 metres at the 1952 Summer Olympics.

References

1927 births
2016 deaths
Athletes (track and field) at the 1952 Summer Olympics
German male middle-distance runners
Olympic athletes of Germany
Place of birth missing